The Speed Limit is a 1926 American silent romantic comedy film directed by Frank O'Connor and starring Raymond McKee, Ethel Shannon and Bruce Gordon. It was produced by the independent company Gotham Pictures.

Synopsis
Tom Milburn, a car enthusiast, is in love with Bess Stanson. However he has a rival Claude Roswell who drives a Rolls-Royce, and frames Milburn for car theft. The film concludes with a motor race in which Milburn triumphs, winning also Bess from his rival.

Cast
 Raymond McKee as 	Tom Milburn
 Ethel Shannon as Bess Stanson
 Bruce Gordon as Claude Roswell
 Georgie Chapman as Henry Berger
 James Conly as 	Eightball Jackson
 Edward W. Borman as 	Biff Garrison
 Rona Lee as 	Muriel Hodge
 Paul Weigel as 	Mr. Charles Benson
 Lucille Thorndyke as Mrs. Charles Benson

References

Bibliography
 Connelly, Robert B. The Silents: Silent Feature Films, 1910-36, Volume 40, Issue 2. December Press, 1998.
 Munden, Kenneth White. The American Film Institute Catalog of Motion Pictures Produced in the United States, Part 1. University of California Press, 1997.

External links
 

1926 films
1926 comedy films
American silent feature films
American auto racing films
Films directed by Frank O'Connor
American black-and-white films
Gotham Pictures films
1920s English-language films
1920s American films
Silent American comedy films